The 2010–11 Atlante season was the 64th professional season of Mexico's top-flight football league. The season is split into two tournaments—the Torneo Apertura and the Torneo Clausura—each with identical formats and each contested by the same eighteen teams. Atlante began the season on July 24, 2010 against Santos Laguna, Atlante will play their home games on Saturdays at 9:00pm local time.

Torneo Apertura

Squad

Apertura 2010 results

Regular season 
All times are in Central Standard Time

Goalscorers

Transfers

In

Out

Results

Results summary

Results by round

Torneo Clausura

Squad

Regular season 
All times are in Central Standard Time

Final phase 

Cruz Azul won 2–1 on aggregate

Friendlies

Goalscorers

Results

Results summary

Results by round

References 

2010–11 Primera División de México season
Mexican football clubs 2010–11 season